CSX Corporation is an American holding company focused on rail transportation and real estate in North America, among other industries. The company was established in 1980 as part of the Chessie System and Seaboard Coast Line Industries merger. The various railroads of the former Chessie System and Seaboard Coast Line Industries that are now owned by CSX Corporation were eventually merged into a single line in 1986 and it became known as CSX Transportation. CSX Corporation currently has a number of subsidiaries beyond CSX Transportation. Previously based in Richmond, Virginia after the merger, the corporation moved its headquarters to Jacksonville, Florida, in 2003. CSX is a Fortune 500 company.

Subsidiaries and divisions

CSX Transportation
CSX Transportation is a Class I railroad operating in the eastern United States and the Canadian provinces of Ontario and Quebec. The railroad operates approximately 21,000 route miles (34,000 km) of track.

As of December 30, 2016, CSX Transportation served population centers in 23 states east of the Mississippi River, the District of Columbia and the Canadian provinces of Ontario and Quebec. Also as of that date, it had access to over 70 ocean, river and lake port terminals along the Atlantic and Gulf Coasts, the Mississippi River, the Great Lakes and the St. Lawrence Seaway.

Following a successful merger application to the Surface Transportation Board, CSX Corporation and CSX Transportation acquired Pan Am Railways in 2022, including a 50 percent stake in Pan Am Southern.

Conrail
Conrail was the primary Class I railroad in the Northeastern United States between 1976 and 1999. The trade name Conrail is a portmanteau based on the company's legal name (Consolidated Rail Corporation), and while it no longer operates trains it continues to do business as an asset management and network services provider in three Shared Assets Areas that were excluded from the division of its operations during its acquisition by CSX Corporation and the Norfolk Southern Railway.

The federal government created Conrail to take over the lines of multiple bankrupt carriers, including the Penn Central Transportation Company and Erie Lackawanna Railway. After railroad regulations were lifted by the 4R Act and the Staggers Act, Conrail began to turn a profit in the 1980s and was privatized in 1987. The two remaining Class I railroads in the East, CSX Transportation and the Norfolk Southern Railway (NS), agreed in 1997 to acquire the system and split it into two roughly-equal parts (alongside three residual shared-assets areas), returning rail freight competition to the Northeast by essentially undoing the 1968 merger of the Pennsylvania Railroad and New York Central Railroad that created Penn Central. Following approval by the Surface Transportation Board, CSX and NS took control in August 1998, and on June 1, 1999 began operating their respective portions of Conrail.

The old company remains a jointly-owned subsidiary, with CSX and NS owning respectively 42 percent and 58 percent of its stock, corresponding to how much of Conrail's assets they acquired. Each parent, however, has an equal voting interest. The primary asset retained by Conrail is ownership of the three Shared Assets Areas in New Jersey, Philadelphia, and Detroit. Both CSX and NS have the right to serve all shippers in these areas, paying Conrail for the cost of maintaining and improving trackage. They also make use of Conrail to perform switching and terminal services within the areas, but not as a common carrier, since contracts are signed between shippers and CSX or NS. Conrail also retains various support facilities including maintenance-of-way and training, as well as a 51 percent share in the Indiana Harbor Belt Railroad.

Winston-Salem Southbound Railway
The Winston-Salem Southbound Railway is a  short-line railroad jointly held by CSX Transportation and the Norfolk Southern Railway, which provides it with equipment. It connects with Norfolk Southern at the north end in Winston-Salem, CSX at the south end in Wadesboro, and in between with NS at Lexington and Whitney, the subsidiary High Point, Thomasville and Denton Railroad at High Rock, and the Aberdeen, Carolina and Western Railway at Norwood. Originally owned jointly by the Atlantic Coast Line Railroad and Norfolk and Western Railway, predecessors to CSX and NS, it was completed in November 1910.

Commodities commonly carried by the railroad are grain, sand, gravel, stone, forest products, paper products, coal, coke, cement, clay fertilizer, aluminum, chemicals, iron, and steel. Its principal shippers are Corn Products Company of Winston-Salem, a manufacturer of corn syrup and related products, and Owens Brockway Glass Company of Eller, a manufacturer of glass products.

P&L Transportation, Inc. 
Formerly Four Rivers Transportation, Inc., P&L is based in Wilmington, Delaware. It is a railroad holding company in the United States. It is jointly owned by the management of the P&L Railway, as well as CSX Corporation, the latter of which holds a majority.

Geographic divisions
CSX is organized into two operating regions: the West Region and the East Region. Each primary region is divided into two sub-regions:

East
Northeast Region, based in Baltimore, Maryland
South Region, based in Waycross, Georgia

West
Midwest Region, based in Cincinnati, Ohio
Southwest Region, based in Nashville, Tennessee

Other subsidiaries
Fruit Growers Express
CSX Intermodal Terminals
CSX Real Property
CSX Technology
Chessie Computer Service
Cybernetics & Services
Total Distribution Services
TRANSFLO Corporation
CSX de Mexico
Powerhouse Logistics

History

CSX Corporation was formed on November 1, 1980, by combining the railroads of the former Chessie System with Seaboard Coast Line Industries.

The name came about during merger talks between Chessie System and SCL, commonly called "Chessie" and "Seaboard". The company chairmen said it was important for the new name to include neither of those names because it was a partnership. Employees were asked for suggestions, most of which consisted of combinations of the initials. At the same time, a temporary shorthand name was needed for discussions with the Interstate Commerce Commission. "CSC" was chosen but belonged to a trucking company in Virginia. "CSM" (for "Chessie-Seaboard Merger") was also taken. The lawyers decided to use "CSX", and the name stuck. In the public announcement, it was said that "CSX is singularly appropriate. C can stand for Chessie, S for Seaboard, and X, which actually has no meaning." However, an August 9, 2016, article on the Railway Age website stated that " ... the 'X' was for 'Consolidated' ". The T had to be added to CSX when used as a reporting mark because reporting marks that end in X means that the car is owned by a leasing company or private car owner. The company introduced its current slogan, "How Tomorrow Moves", in 2008.

CSX Corporation sold two-thirds of its control of water transport company American Commercial Barge Line in 1998, citing a desire to focus more on rail operations.

The founding chairman of CSX Corporation was Prime F. Osborn III of Seaboard, for whom Jacksonville's Prime F. Osborn III Convention Center is named. The first CEO and second chairman was Hays T. Watkins Jr. of Chessie. Watkins was succeeded by John W. Snow as CEO in 1989 and as chairman in 1991. When Snow left the company in 2003 to become United States Secretary of the Treasury, Michael J. Ward, who then headed CSX Transportation, was promoted to succeed him. Overall in 2003, Ward took on the positions of chairman, president, and  CEO. When president Oscar Munoz left CSX in September 2015 after obtaining the role earlier that year from Ward, the company underwent several management changes, with Clarence Gooden appointed president.

The company went through major leadership changes in 2017 when activist investor Mantle Ridge, a hedge fund that held 4.9% of CSX's stock, demanded a change in the board, that Michael Ward step down as CEO, that the company cut middle management, and that the company hire Hunter Harrison, known for leading the turnaround three other railroads, as CEO.  Within months of Harrison's hiring in spring 2017, several members of CSX's executive management team stepped down. Harrison died on December 16, 2017 and shortly thereafter Chief Operating Officer James M. Foote was named president and chief executive officer.

In March 2018, Foote, said CSX would follow-through on Harrison's plans to transform the company and move it from a traditional railroad model to a scheduled railroad model in order to reduce costs and improve the quality of service. Part of this effort includes reducing the number of locomotives in service from 3,000 in late 2017 to between 2,370 and 2,420 in 2020. The company also plans to reduce the number of rail cars it owns from 136,000 in late 2017 to between 104,000 and 109,000 in 2020. In 2017, CSX cut its workforce by 3,300 employees. In 2018, roughly 2,200 jobs were cut. A further reduction of 4,000 positions is planned by 2020. CSX estimates that after these cuts it will have a workforce of about 21,000 people.

CSX is also trying to increase profits by monetizing some of its real estate. As of early 2018, the company planned to generate $800 million by 2020 by selling off some railroad lines and other real estate. As of the same date, CSX held real estate in 23 states, the District of Columbia, and two Canadian provinces.

Officers

Presidents
 Hays T.(Thomas) Watkins, Jr. (1980 – April 1989)
 John W. Snow (April 1989 – 2003)
 Michael J. Ward (2000 – 2015)
 Oscar Munoz (February 11, 2015 – )
 Clarence W. Gooden ( – May 31, 2017)
 Fredrik J. Eliasson (February 15, 2017 – )
 E. Hunter Harrison ( – December 16, 2017)
 James M. Foote (Acting: December 16, 2017 – December 22, 2017, Full: December 22, 2017 – September 26, 2022)
 Joseph Hinrichs (September 26, 2022 - Present)

Chief Executive Officers
 John W. Snow (April 1989 – 2003)
 Peter Carpenter (1992 – 1999)
 Oscar Munoz (2015 – )
 Michael J. Ward ( – February 21, 2017)
 E. Hunter Harrison (March 6, 2017 – December 16, 2017)
 James M. Foote (December 22, 2017 – September 26, 2022)
 Joseph Hinrichs (September 26, 2022 - Present)

Chairmen of the Board of Directors
 Prime F. Osborn III (1980 – 1982)
 Hays T. Watkins, Jr. (1982 – January 31, 1991)
 John W. Snow (January 31, 1991 – 2003)
 Michael J. Ward (2003 – February 21, 2017)
 Edward J. Kelly, III (2017 – January 2019)
 John J. Zillmer (January 2019 – Present)

Leadership
The following is a list of CSX management as of November 2022:

John J. Zillmer, chairman of the board of directors
Joe Hinrichs, president and chief executive officer
Sean Pelkey, executive vice president and chief financial officer
Kevin Boone, executive vice president of sales and marketing
Jamie Boychuk, executive vice president of operations
Nathan D. Goldman, executive vice president, chief legal officer and corporate secretary
Diana B. Sorfleet, executive vice president and chief administrative officer
Steve Fortune, executive vice president and chief digital and technology officer

Finances
At the end of 2018, CSX Corporation's total shareholder's equity was reported as US$12.58 billion and total assets were valued at $36.729 billion. Total revenue for 2018 was $12.25 billion, an increase from $11.408 billion the previous year. Operating income was $4.869 billion, up from $3.72 billion in 2017, while earnings before income taxes were $4.304 billion, compared to $3.142 billion the previous year.

As of 2019, CSX Corporation was a Fortune 500 company.

Headquarters
Completed in 1960, the building currently serves as headquarters for CSX Corporation. The building is located in the Northbank area of Downtown Jacksonville, along the banks of the St. Johns River. Its former names include the Atlantic Coast Line Building  and  the Seaboard Coastline Railroad Building. Designed by KBJ Architects, the CSX Transportation Building is a LEED certified building and an example of mid-century modern and international style architecture.

See also

History of railroads in Michigan
List of CSX Transportation lines
List of CSX Transportation predecessor railroads
Railex (refrigerated rail service - CSX and Union Pacific Railroad)

References

External links

 

Companies listed on the Nasdaq
Companies based in Jacksonville, Florida
Companies in the Dow Jones Transportation Average
CSX Transportation
United States railroad holding companies
1980 establishments in Florida
Railway companies established in 1980
Northbank, Jacksonville
Publicly traded companies based in Jacksonville, Florida
Multinational companies based in Jacksonville